The Wellcome Centre for Human Neuroimaging at University College London is a world-leading interdisciplinary centre for neuroimaging research based in London, United Kingdom. Researchers at the Centre use expertise to investigate how the human brain generates behaviour, thoughts and feelings and how to use this knowledge to help patients with neurological and psychiatric disorders. Human neuroimaging allows scientists to non-invasively investigate the brain structure and functions including Action, Decision Making, Emotion, Hearing, Language, Memory, Navigation, Seeing, Self awareness, Social Behaviour and the Bayesian Brain

The Wellcome Centre for Human Neuroimaging is part of UCL's Department for Imaging Neuroscience, alongside The Max Planck UCL Centre for Computational Psychiatry and Ageing and Affiliated Principal Investigators (PIs). 

The current team of researchers and support staff use their diverse and interdisciplinary skills to work collaboratively towards one shared goal: to use neuroimaging to understand and help patients with neurological and psychiatric disorders. Principal investigators working at the Centre include Professors John Ashburner, Dominik Bach, Gareth Barnes, Sven Bestmann, Neil Burgess, Martina Callaghan, Jenny Crinion,  Ray Dolan,  Stephen Fleming, Karl Friston, Tim Griffiths, Alex Leff, Vladimir Litvak, Eleanor Maguire,  Mairead MacSweeney, Tamar Makin,  Cathy Price, Geraint Rees, Jon Roiser;   and  Drs  Guillaume Flandin, Tobias Hauser, Quentin Huys, Peter Kok, Christian Lambert, Clare Press, Rimona Weil,  Elliot Wimmer and Peter Zeidman.

The centre is located at 12 Queen Square in the Bloomsbury area of Central London, adjacent to the National Hospital for Neurology and Neurosurgery

History

Over 25 years, the Wellcome Centre for Human Neuroimaging has pioneered innovation and applications in imaging neuroscience, addressed fundamental biological questions, and played a leading role in transforming cognitive and systems neuroscience. Since its founding in 1994, it has been led by a number of Directors:

1994: Wellcome Department for Cognitive Neurology

Founding Director: Richard Frackowiak

 Deputy: Semir Zeki

Main focus: Addressing key questions about brain function and cognition.

The Functional Imaging Laboratory (FIL) was founded in 1994 following a major award from the Wellcome Trust. It was incorporated within UCL's Institute of Neurology, as the Wellcome Department of Cognitive Neurology. The centre's early work pioneered and openly shared new neuroimaging techniques and analyses for understanding human cognition.

2002: Wellcome Trust Centre for Neuroimaging

Director: Ray Dolan

 Scientific Director: Karl Friston

Main focus: Pioneering computational modelling approaches to neuroimaging.

In 2006, following a successful bid for a Strategic Award, the laboratory was awarded Wellcome Trust Centre status (renewed in 2011), becoming the Wellcome Trust Centre for Neuroimaging. A key development was computational models of behaviour that could be linked to dynamic brain activity. In 2014, the Max Planck-UCL Centre for Computational Psychiatry and Ageing Research was opened.

2015: Wellcome Centre for Human Neuroimaging

Director: Cathy Price

 Previous Deputy: Eleanor Maguire 
 Current Deputy: Martina Callaghan

Main focus: Delivering clinically-transformative computational neuroimaging.

Renamed the Wellcome Centre for Human Neuroimaging after funding renewal in an open competition, the focus of our mission is to pioneer the clinical translation of human neuroimaging.

Facilities 
The Wellcome Centre for Human Neuroimaging’s diverse technical capabilities enable their researchers to conduct complex studies exploring both temporal and spatial brain activity with greater specificity.

In-house facilities include:

 7T Siemens Terra magnetic resonance imaging (MRI) scanner with parallel transmission capability.
 Two research-dedicated 3T Siemens TIM-Trio magnetic resonance imaging (MRI) scanners, one of which is additionally equipped with a prospective motion correction system.
 A CTF-Omega 275-channel magnetoencephalography (MEG) system.
 Purpose-built room for the use of optically pumped magnetometers (OPMs)
 A number of electroencephalography (EEG) systems
 Several behavioural testing rooms enabling neuropsychological, psycho-pharmacological and transcranial magnetic stimulation (TMS) studies.
 Well-developed systems for simultaneous TMS-fMRI.

To find out more about the scanning technology at the centre, please visit the Wellcome Centre for Human Neuroimaging website.

See also 
Statistical Parametric Mapping

References

External links 
 
 Wellcome Trust website

Medical imaging organizations
Neuroimaging
Neuroscience research centres in the United Kingdom
Research institutes in London
University College London
Wellcome Trust